Chaiyaphum can refer to

the town Chaiyaphum
Chaiyaphum Province
Mueang Chaiyaphum district